A partially disclosed principal is one whose agent reveals that he has a principal, but does not reveal the principal's identity. This concept has important implications in liability law. It is in contrast to a disclosed principal and undisclosed principal.

Notes

References 
The legal, ethical, and international environment of business By Herbert M. Bohlman, Mary Jane Dundas

Agency law